Ministro Andreazza is a municipality located in the Brazilian state of Rondônia. Its population was 9,559 (2020) and its area is 798 km².

References

Municipalities in Rondônia